Kugluktuk, formerly known as Coppermine until 1 January 1996, is a hamlet located at the mouth of the Coppermine River in the Kitikmeot Region of Nunavut, Canada, on Coronation Gulf, southwest of Victoria Island. It is the westernmost community in Nunavut, near the border with the Northwest Territories.

The traditional language of the area is Inuinnaqtun and is written using the Latin alphabet, rather than the syllabics of the Inuktitut writing system. Like Cambridge Bay, Bathurst Inlet, and Umingmaktok, syllabics are rarely seen and are used mainly by the Government of Nunavut.

History 
In 1982, a division plebiscite was held. While approximately 80% of the population in what is now Nunavut voted in favour of division, Coppermine was one of only two communities to vote against division. Cambridge Bay was the other. In June 2004, a fuel line broke in the centre of Kugluktuk, spilling  of diesel fuel.

Demographics 

Infrastructure 

The community has been served by the Qiniq network since 2005. Qiniq is a fixed wireless service to homes and businesses, connecting to the outside world via a satellite backbone. The Qiniq network is designed and operated by SSi Canada. In 2017, the network was upgraded to 4G LTE technology, and 2G-GSM for mobile voice.

Education 
The two schools in the community are Kugluktuk High School and Jimmy Hikok Ilihakvik.

Geography
Kugluktuk is located on the shore of the Arctic Ocean. The surrounding landscape is dominated by the rocky and often barren Canadian Shield. It has cold, dry winters, and moderate snowfall which is relatively high for its latitude. Though trees do exist in the region, they are dwarfed and extremely sparse.

Flora
Plant growth in the region during summer months includes small shrubs, grass, moss, lichens, blueberries, blackberries, cranberries, various flowers, and dwarf willow and birch trees.

Climate
Kugluktuk features a subarctic climate (Köppen climate classification: Dfc); like most of mainland Nunavut; with wet summers and dry winters. It is in the transitional zone to a cold tundra climate (ET), but falls outside of it, since its warmest month of July surpasses the  isotherm, averaging .

Gallery

See also

List of municipalities in Nunavut
Kugluk/Bloody Falls Territorial Park
Bloody Falls Massacre
Bloody Falls
Kugluktuk Airport
Joe Allen Evyagotailak
Donald Havioyak
Lena Pedersen
Kangiryuatjagmiut
Kangiryuarmiut
John Sperry
The Grizzlies

Notes

References

Office of the Languages Commissioner of Nunavut – PDF Dialect Map
Office of the Languages Commissioner of Nunavut – Writing systems

Further reading

 Dredge, L. A. Where the river meets the sea geology and landforms of the lower Coppermine River Valley and Kugluktuk, Nunavut. [Ottawa]: Geological Survey of Canada, 2001. 
 Pedersen, Lena, and Donna Stephania. Crime Prevention in Kugluktuk. Ottawa: Caledon Institute of Social Policy, 1999. 

Designated places in Nunavut
Hamlets in the Kitikmeot Region
Populated places in Arctic Canada
Road-inaccessible communities of Nunavut